List of the most important archaeological monuments of Azerbaijan – the list of the most important archaeological monuments approved by the decision number 132 of the Cabinet of the Republic of Azerbaijan dated August 2, 2001 and indicated to be registered in Azerbaijan. The oldest monuments on the list are Azikh and Taghlar caves, located respectively in Fuzuli and Khojavend districts, belonging to the Kuruchay culture period. One of the listed monuments is included in the UNESCO World Heritage List. Four of the listed monuments are cultural, architectural and historical reserves.

List

References

Literature 
 Mammadali Huseynov, A. K. Jafarov – Paleolithic of Azerbaijan, Elm, 1986
 M. Huseynov – Ancient Paleolithic of Azerbaijan, Baku, Elm, 1985
Archeology of Azerbaijan, in six volumes, I volume, Baku 
 
 A. Alakbarov – Researches on archeology and ethnography of Azerbaijan, Baku, 1960

See also 
 List of World Heritage Sites in Azerbaijan
 UNESCO Intangible Cultural Heritage List in Azerbaijan

Buildings and structures in Azerbaijan
Monuments and memorials in Azerbaijan
Architecture in Azerbaijan
History of Azerbaijan
Archaeology of Azerbaijan